Arriva Southend is a division of Arriva Southern Counties, a subsidiary of transport group Arriva which operates bus services in and around the Southend-on-Sea, Rochford, Rayleigh areas of Essex. They operate most services east of Southend and a few services west of Southend, and compete to a limited extent with three other local operators with services in the same areas: First Essex, NIBS and Stephensons of Essex.

History

The company was founded in 1901 as Southend Corporation Transport, and was renamed Southend Transport in 1974. It began operating motorbuses in 1912, and became a limited company on 26 October 1986 due to the Transport Act 1985. Southend Transport was involved in a price war with Thamesway (now part of First Essex). Southend Transport was sold by Southend Borough Council to the British Bus group in June 1993 for a reported £1, which in turn was taken over by the Cowie group.

Cowie was renamed Arriva in August 1998 and Southend Transport was renamed Arriva serving Southend as part of this rebranding. The 'serving Southend' local identity caption has since been phased out.

On 28 January 2000, the original Southend garage at 87 London Road dating from the foundation of Southend Corporation Transport was closed and demolished shortly afterwards, with a new one constructed in Short Street, Southend-on-Sea.

Arriva Southend had continued the service X1 coach service to London inherited from Southend Transport, latterly as the Green Line 721 service.

A restructuring in 2002 saw overall control of Arriva Colchester and Arriva Southend pass to Arriva Southern Counties from Arriva East Herts & Essex.

On 30 March 2008 both commercially run services from the Grays garage (routes 373 and 383) were withdrawn, with the buses used for these services moving to Southend garage. The Grays garage now only operates the Transport for London (TfL) contracted services.

Criticisms
Arriva Southend has been criticised by users and the Southend Area Bus Users' Group for withdrawing services which it considered no longer economically viable due to low passenger numbers (even when parts of the route were profitable) when Southend Borough Council withdrew bus subsidies of up to £6 per passenger in 2005. On 21 January 2008 Southend Area Bus Users' Group and Councilor Steve Aylen successfully campaigned for improvements to Service 6A after having been withdrawn in 2005. On 31 March 2008, service 7 was extended at the suggestion of Great Wakering Parish Council and the Rochford Crime and Disorder Reduction Partnership, who are subsidising the service. The company trials the operation of new services to gauge service demand, and makes services permanent if there are enough passengers to support them being run.

In 2007, Arriva Southend were criticised by Southend Borough Council for the age of its bus fleet, as some of its buses at the time were nearly 20 years old and many did not have low-floor, easy-access step-free entry which was important for older people, as Southend had an ageing population with the most senior citizens in the country, although most areas did not have full low-floor networks at the time, and buses were built to have working lives of about 20 years.

Further criticism came from passengers when Arriva Southend and First Essex decided to withdraw their "Day Rover" ticket, which allowed unlimited journeys on the day of purchase on buses operated by both companies regardless of which company issued the ticket, so day tickets can now only be used on the buses of the company issuing them. They replaced it with a more expensive "Octopus" ticket which is issued by and can be used on any buses operated by Arriva Southend, First Essex, NIBS, Regal Busways and Stephensons of Essex in the Southend, Rochford and Castle Point districts, covering more bus operators and a wider area of Essex.

On 8 February 2009, Arriva reduced the frequency of services 7 and 8 to some areas, which angered some residents in Hockley and Hawkwell, as it made it very difficult for them to get to and from Southend Hospital and Clements Hall Leisure Centre on time due to the 7 and 8 either running very late in the Shoebury area, or buses turning back before reaching their terminating point. The move also dismayed Rochford councillors. The Hockley Residents' Association also said that the figures for low customer numbers used to justify the frequency reduction were flawed. After receiving numerous complaints from Hockley residents, on 7 June 2009 Arriva Southend extended some service 7 buses to Hockley Spa instead of terminating at Ashingdon Schools. It is likely that this extra service is now going to stay after a review in December 2009. Hawkwell residents then sent further complaints to the Essex County Council about service 8 not having evening services after 6:30pm since 2002. They demanded that one of the service 7 evening buses to become an 8 and divert to Hawkwell. Essex County Council said it would not be possible to add an evening service to service 8. Arriva Southend have also been criticised for running all of their services in the Shoeburyness area via Asda, after they changed the route of Service 1 to run through Asda instead of Elm Road.

Arriva Southend has started using an "undercover passenger" scheme to attempt to better understand problems and complaints with the changes they have made to their services, encouraging passengers to participate by offering them a week's free bus travel for rating the services they use.

There has been crictism from passengers frequently using Service 29, which was merged with Service 13 to provide a through service from Belfairs to Temple Sutton since 27 March 2011. The route merger resulted in drivers not given sufficient time to complete the whole route, which has caused buses to turn back before reaching their terminating point, missing out certain bus stops and leaving passengers stranded from over 45 to 90 minutes to wait for the next Service 29.

Fleet
Twelve new low-emission (Euro 5-compliant), CCTV-fitted Optare Versa V1110 midibuses were bought at a cost of £1.8 million for Service 9 and entered public service in November 2011.

See also
List of bus operators of the United Kingdom

References

External links

Arriva Buses UK company website
Arriva Buses Southend website

Southend
Companies based in Essex
Transport in Southend-on-Sea
Transport in Thurrock